Roderick Darryl Martin (born April 7, 1954) is a former American football linebacker who played in the National Football League (NFL) for the Oakland / Los Angeles Raiders from 1977 to 1988. He is best known for his record three interceptions in Super Bowl XV, which put him on the cover of Sports Illustrated.

High school career
Martin went to Hamilton High School, a year ahead of NFL hall of fame quarterback Warren Moon.

College career
Before his NFL career, Martin played college football at the University of Southern California (USC), where he was a 1976 All-Pac-10 selection. Prior to USC, Martin played at Los Angeles City College.

Professional career
Martin was one of the top linebackers in the NFL during his 12 seasons and made the Pro Bowl twice during his career, in 1983 and 1984. Selected in the twelfth round of the 1977 NFL Draft, Martin was initially a   tweener, undersized for a Linebacker and slow for a Safety, but eventually bulked up to 220-225. In 1978, his second year, Martin started 8 games, filling in at Inside Linebacker By 1979, he settled in at the weak-side LB spot, becoming a mainstay on the Raider defense, assisting the Silver & Black to two Super Bowl victories (1980, 1983 seasons) and having an outstanding performance in each one. In Super Bowl XV, Martin recorded a Super Bowl record three interceptions from Philadelphia Eagles quarterback Ron Jaworski, and returned them for 44 yards. His interceptions were not only a Super Bowl record, but they also tied linebacker Chuck Howley's record for career Super Bowl interceptions. Among these players, Martin is the only one to record all 3 of his interceptions in one game. In Super Bowl XVIII, Martin broke up a third down pass on his own 7-yard line in the second quarter, sacked Joe Theismann once,  tackled Washington Redskins Hall of Fame running back John Riggins for no gain on a fourth down and one conversion attempt deep in Raiders territory on the last play of the third quarter, and recovered a fumble in the final period.

In his 12 NFL seasons, Martin recorded 14 interceptions, which he returned for 225 yards and 4 touchdowns, along with 10 fumble recoveries, which he returned for 122 yards and two touchdowns. He also recorded 33 and a half official sacks (sacks were not an official statistic until 1982, Martin's 5th season).

Personal
Martin has returned to work at USC, where he is a programmer and manager of technical and user support services in the Information Sciences Institute. Martin has two daughters: Jessica, who played volleyball at Bethune-Cookman University, and Jade, a softball player who attended Morgan State University.

According to the 2003 Tampa Bay Devil Rays media guide, Al Martin is a nephew of Rod Martin.

References

1954 births
Living people
Alexander Hamilton High School (Los Angeles) alumni
American football linebackers
Los Angeles Raiders players
Oakland Raiders players
USC Trojans football players
American Conference Pro Bowl players
Los Angeles City College alumni
People from Welch, West Virginia
Players of American football from West Virginia